Tang Qir (also Romanized as Tang Qīr) is a village in Kheyrabad Rural District, in the Central District of Kharameh County, Fars Province, Iran. At the 2006 census, its population was 195, in 53 families.

References 

Populated places in Kharameh County